Easterling is an English surname. Notable people with the surname include:

Addison Rae Easterling (born 2000), American social media personality 
Howard Easterling (1911–1993), American baseball player
Keller Easterling, American architect
P. E. Easterling (born 1934), English classical scholar
Paul Easterling (1905–1993), American baseball player
Ray Easterling (1949–2012), American football player
Ruth M. Easterling (1910–2006), American politician
William Easterling (born 1953), American professor

See also
Easterlin

English-language surnames